Olav Torstein Seiersten (born 22 February 1931) is a retired Norwegian speed skater who won the 10,000 metres event at the 1956 World Allround Championships. He placed 10th in the 5,000 metres at the 1956 Winter Olympics. At the 1960 Winter Olympics, he finished 4th in the 5,000 metres and 6th in the 10,000 metres.

References

1931 births
Living people
People from Gran, Norway
Speed skaters at the 1956 Winter Olympics
Speed skaters at the 1960 Winter Olympics
Norwegian male speed skaters
Olympic speed skaters of Norway
Sportspeople from Innlandet